Tama Maru No. 5 (Japanese: 第三玉丸) was an auxiliary minesweeper of the Imperial Japanese Navy during World War II.

History
Tama Maru No. 5 was laid down on 25 April 1936 at the Hikoshima shipyard of Mitsubishi Jukogyo K.K. at the behest of shipping company, Taiyo Hogei K.K. She was launched on 6 August 1936 and completed 27 September 1936. On 12 September 1941, she was requisitioned by the Imperial Japanese Navy and converted to an auxiliary minesweeper under Reserve Lieutenant Takato Akiro (高遠章). Takato served until 17 October 1943 when he was replaced by Reserve Lieutenant Fukigami Kiyomitsu (吹上清光). Her fate is uncertain. She was removed from the Navy list on 31 March 1944.

References

1936 ships
Ships built by Mitsubishi Heavy Industries
World War II minesweepers of Japan
Mine warfare vessels of the Imperial Japanese Navy
Auxiliary ships of the Imperial Japanese Navy